HD 133683 is a single star in the southern constellation of Triangulum Australe. It has a yellow-white hue and is dimly visible to the naked eye with an apparent visual magnitude of +5.76. The distance to this star is approximately 3,600 light-years based on parallax, but it is drifting closer with a radial velocity of −14.7 km/s.

This is a massive supergiant star with a stellar classification of F5Ib. It has around 11 times the mass of the Sun and is spinning with a projected rotational velocity of 4.7 km/s. The star has expanded to 79 times the radius of the Sun.

References 

F-type supergiants
Triangulum Australe
Durchmusterung objects
133683
074184
5621